Blondie, Beef and the Banana (Swedish: Blondie Biffen och Bananen) is a 1952 Swedish comedy film directed by Lars-Eric Kjellgren and starring Åke Grönberg, Åke Söderblom and Doris Svedlund. It was shot at the Råsunda Studios in Stockholm. The film's sets were designed by the art director Nils Svenwall. It is an adaptation of the long-running comic strip of the same title by Jan-Erik Garland. It is the second of a trilogy of films also including  Beef and the Banana (1951) and Klarar Bananen Biffen? (1957)

Cast
 Åke Grönberg as 	Biffen Johansson
 Åke Söderblom as 	Bananen Jansson
 Doris Svedlund as Anita Becker
 Lennart Lindberg as 	Georg Hector
 Håkan Westergren as 	Rudolf Carlman
 Emy Hagman as 	Bojan
 Git Gay as 	Lou-Lou Andersson
 Haide Göransson as 	Anita's Friend
 Erik 'Bullen' Berglund as 	Rich Horse Buyer 
 Wiktor Andersson as 	Andersson 
 Harry Ahlin as 	Auctionist 
 Jules Berman as 	Conferencier 
 David Erikson as 	Horse Better 
 Karl Erik Flens as 	Horse Jockey 
 Åke Jensen as 	Man at Ulriksdal 
 Arne Källerud as 	Betting cashier 
 Lars Kåge as 	Man at Ulriksdal 
 Guje Lagerwall as 	Miss Berg 
 Nils Ohlin as 	Director Hoffman 
 Mille Schmidt as 	Bartender 
 Mauritz Strömbom as Speculative Buyer 
 Eric von Gegerfelt as 	Speculative Buyer 
 Alf Östlund as 	Speculative Buyer

References

Bibliography 
 Wredlund, Bertil & Lindfors, Rolf . Långfilm i Sverige: 1950–1959. Proprius, 1979.

External links 
 

1952 films
Swedish comedy films
1952 comedy films
1950s Swedish-language films
Films directed by Lars-Eric Kjellgren
Swedish sequel films
1950s Swedish films
Films based on Swedish comics
Live-action films based on comics